Johns Cirque is a cirque on the east side of McLean Buttress in the Cruzen Range of Victoria Land. It was named by the Advisory Committee on Antarctic Names in 2005 after Bjorn Johns, project manager from 1996 to 2005 of the University NAVSTAR Consortium (UNAVCO), a consortium of 30 U.S. Universities that provides support of surveying, mapping, and other applications of the Global Positioning System to the United States Antarctic Program.

References

External links

Landforms of Victoria Land